Shirley Temple (1928–2014) was an American child actress, dancer, and singer who began her film career in 1931, and continued successfully through 1949. When Educational Pictures director Charles Lamont scouted Meglan Dancing School for prospective talent, three-year-old student Temple hid behind the piano. Lamont spotted her and immediately decided she was the one he was looking for. Starting at $10 a day, she was eventually under contract for $50 per film. The production company generated its Baby Burlesks one-reeler  film short satires of Hollywood films in 1931–1933, produced by Jack Hays and directed by Lamont. Temple made eight Baby Burlesks films, and 10 other short films, before being signed to star in feature-length motion pictures.

The role that launched her feature film career was a short song-and-dance sequence in the 1934 movie Stand Up and Cheer! for Fox Film, with James Dunn as her father. Her performance impressed studio executives so much that they immediately cast the duo in a follow-up film, Baby Take a Bow, with Temple again playing Dunn's daughter. Following the release of that film, Temple's parents negotiated two 7-year Fox contracts, one for Shirley as the performer, and the other for her mother as her guardian. Her parents had stipulations inserted to protect their daughter's privacy, while Fox retained control of all her public appearances. The bulk of the financial recompense went into revocable trusts. Later that same year, the film Bright Eyes was written as a starring vehicle for Temple, teaming her once again with Dunn. In this film, Temple sang the song most identified with her: "On the Good Ship Lollipop".

In addition to Dunn, Temple danced in her films with some of the most famous and accomplished entertainers of her era: Buddy Ebsen, Jack Haley, Alice Faye, George Murphy, Jimmy Durante, Charlotte Greenwood, and Jack Oakie. Bill "Bojangles" Robinson was her favorite partner. "It was kind of a magic between us", she later reminisced, and said he taught her how to execute her dance moves by syncing with the rhythm of the music, as opposed to watching her steps. In 1935's The Little Colonel, the first of their four films together, they made history as the first interracial couple to dance on screen.

Temple's films, made for between $400,000 and $700,000 each, earned millions of dollars in gross receipts in the United States and Canada. Her films ranked number-one at the box office in 1935, 1936, 1937, and 1938. The success of her films was also credited with saving her studio, 20th Century Fox, from bankruptcy during the Great Depression.

At the 7th Academy Awards in 1935, Temple was honored with the first Academy Juvenile Award. That same year, her hand prints and bare foot prints were immortalized in cement at Grauman's Chinese Theatre. At previous hand and foot print ceremonies, other celebrities traditionally left hand and shoe prints in the cement. The bare feet distraction was her idea to  divert attention away from a gap in her smile left by a baby tooth that had fallen out. She received a star on the Hollywood Walk of Fame on February 8, 1960. Following the end of her film career, Temple had a two-season run of Shirley Temple's Storybook anthology on the NBC television network.

During the years 1974–1989, she served in the United States diplomatic corps under her married name of Shirley Temple Black.

Features

Baby Burlesks

Other short films

Bibliography
 
 
 
 

The American Creed (1946)

References

Actress filmographies
American filmographies
Filmography